George Baysah Yokoe (born March 1, 1991, in Montserrado County, Liberia) is a Liberian footballer, who currently plays for Maccabi Umm al-Fahm F.C.

Career 
The defender played previously for Hapoel Kfar Saba, in Liberia for LISCR and Watanga FC.

International 
Baysah made his international debut against Equatorial Guinea on 3 September 2006.

Notes 

1991 births
Living people
Liberian footballers
Liberia international footballers
Association football defenders
LISCR FC players
Hapoel Kfar Saba F.C. players
Maccabi Umm al-Fahm F.C. players
Liga Leumit players
Liberian expatriate footballers
Expatriate footballers in Israel
Liberian expatriate sportspeople in Israel
People from Montserrado County